VKS (ВКС) or VSSK (ВССК) is a Russian bullpup, straight-pull bolt-action, magazine-fed sniper rifle chambered for the 12.7×55mm STs-130 subsonic round. The weapon is also known by the name VSSK and the additional name Vykhlop (Выхлоп), "Exhaust", which comes from the development program. It was developed in around 2002 for the special force units of FSB.

The 12.7×55mm VKS silenced sniper rifle is intended for special operations that require silent firing and penetration much superior to that provided by 9×39mm VSS silenced sniper rifle. Typical targets for the VKS are combatants in heavy body armor or behind cover. The weapon uses an integral suppressor.

Design
The special round has an overall length of 97 mm. The accuracy is claimed as 1 minute of arc at a 100-meter range with precision bullets.

Cartridge variants:
 SC-130 (СЦ-130) - standard
 SC-130U (СЦ-130У) - for training
 SC-130PT (СЦ-130ПТ) - increased accuracy (59 gram bullet)
 SC-130PT2 (СЦ-130ПТ2) - increased accuracy (solid bronze bullet)
 SC-130VPS (СЦ-130ВПС) - increased penetration (76 gram bullet). Capable of penetrating 16 mm of steel at 200 meters, or body armor up to GOST 5 at 100 meters.

See also
List of Russian weaponry
List of bullpup firearms
List of sniper rifles

References

External links

 VKS
 Pic 1 Pic 2  (Photos of what appears to be a different variant of the VKS, or one of the similar competitive weapons of the same or similar development program. One of the differences is the muzzle suppressor, which can be removed and the weapon fired without it.)
 https://en.defence-ua.com: The 10 Most Interesting russia’s Weapons, Which Got Destroyed or Became a Trophy of the Armed Forces of Ukraine  (last section)

12.7 mm firearms
12.7 mm sniper rifles
Straight-pull rifles
Sniper rifles of Russia
Silenced firearms
Bullpup rifles
TsKIB SOO products